List of Lords of Saint-Floris, former Flemish title, coupled to the Heerlijkheid of Sint-Floris, located in Artois. The title belonged to the Flemish House of Haveskercke.

Lords of Saint-Floris 

Bernard van Haveskercke, Lord of Sint-Floris x Jeanne de Wissocq.
Justin de Haverskerque, Lord of Saint-Floris x Marguerite de Stavele.
Marguerite de Haverskerque, Lady of Saint-Floris x Henri de Nedonchel.
Jean i de Nedonchel, Lord of Saint-Floris x Marie of Cunchy, lady of Quesnoy
Marie de Nedonchel, Lady of Saint-Floris x Gilles de Gosson
Catherine de Gosson, Lady of Saint-Floris xLouis de la Plancque, Lord of Wastinnes.
Barbara de la Plancque, Lady of Saint-Floris: Married in 1570 to Charles de Ghistelles, Grand Bailiff of the City of Bruges, Governor of Mechelen.
Alexander de Ghistelles, Lord of Saint-Floris xmarried in 1610 to Florence de Wissocq
Adrian-François de Ghistelles, 1st Marques of Saint-Floris.

See also 
 Marquess of Saint-Floris

References

Lords of Belgium
History of the Pas-de-Calais